Bitter Lake is a lake in South Dakota, in the United States.

Bitter Lake contains bitter tasting lake water, hence the name.

See also
List of lakes in South Dakota

References

Lakes of South Dakota
Lakes of Day County, South Dakota